Ian Fleming (1908–1964) was a British author, creator of James Bond.

Ian Fleming may also refer to:
Ian Fleming (actor) (1888–1969), Australian character actor
Ian Fleming (chemist) (born 1935), English chemist
Ian Fleming (cricketer) (1908–1988), English cricketer
Ian Fleming (footballer) (born 1953), Scottish footballer
Ian Fleming (Australian footballer, born 1909) (1909–1984), Australian rules football player for Fitzroy
Ian Fleming (Australian footballer, born 1937), Australian rules football player for Footscray

See also 
Iain Fleming, CFL player in the 2005 CFL Draft
Ian Fleming International Airport, a Jamaican airport, named after the author
Ian Fleming Publications, a production company that administers all of the author's works
CWA Ian Fleming Steel Dagger, an award for thriller novels, sponsored by the author's estate
Fleming (disambiguation)